The Stony Brook Seawolves men's basketball team is the college basketball program representing Stony Brook University in Stony Brook, New York. The Seawolves have been competing at the NCAA Division I level since 1999, and are a member of the Colonial Athletic Association. The team is coached by former Kent State head coach Geno Ford after former head coach, longtime Ohio State assistant Jeff Boals, resigned to accept the head coaching job at his alma mater Ohio University.

The Seawolves currently play their home games in the Island Federal Credit Union Arena, located on the university's campus in Stony Brook, New York. The team had their most successful year in the 2015–16, winning the America East regular season and tournament title to earn a bid to their first NCAA tournament. The Seawolves have won four regular season titles and have reached the 20–win mark eight times as a Division I program. The official student section is known as "The Red Zone" and was voted as the top student section in the America East conference in the 2014 Naismith Student Section of the Year competition.

Team history

Pre-Division I era (1960–1999) 
Stony Brook University first fielded a basketball program in the 1960–61 basketball season initially playing their home games at the local Walt Whitman High School (1960–1962) while located at Oyster Bay (at that time State University College on Long Island). The campus relocated to its present site in 1962 and temporarily played their home games at Port Jefferson High School (1962–64) until the construction of the Pritchard Gymnasium in the late 1960s. Since the 1960s, the Stony Brook Patriots played at the Division III level and participated in several different conferences, also spending many years of its development as an independent program.

While first struggling in its initial years with Dan Farrell (1960–64), Stony Brook later enjoyed some success in the Knickerbocker Conference with coach Herbie Brown (Larry Brown's brother). He was head basketball coach at Stony Brook in 1964–69, earning Coach of the Year honors following the 1969 season. Hall of Fame coach Rollie Massimino, who later led Villanova to a national championship in 1985, coached Stony Brook from 1969 to 1971. During the 1977–78 season, Stony Brook reached the Final Four of the NCAA Division III men's basketball tournament. Coaches Ron Bash, Dick Kendall, and Joe Castigle helped develop the program in the late 1970s and 1980s, and by the early 1990s, Stony Brook participated in the New York metropolitan-based Skyline Conference.

By the 1990s, the University experienced tremendous growth in its academic programs, leading Stony Brook to become one of the leading public research universities in the nation. As its athletics lagged behind, President Shirley Strum Kenny sought to transition Stony Brook to the Division I level. The Stony Brook Patriots were renamed to the Seawolves in 1995 and offered scholarships for the first time.

Division II basketball was played until 1999, when the men's basketball officially entered Division I after a four-year transition under the command of head coach Bernard Tomlin. In 2001, after two years of basketball at the D-I Independent level, the Seawolves joined the America East conference.

Early years in Division I and Steve Pikiell takes the helm (1999–2008) 

The initial years of the Stony Brook men's basketball program in the America East conference faced many hardships, and the team remained in the bottom slots of the conference standings year after year from 2001 through 2008. In their first seven seasons in the conference, Stony Brook did not have a winning season in conference play or overall.

In May 2005, the NCAA placed Stony Brook on three years' probation, stripping 12.5 scholarships due to eligibility violations. The NCAA Committee of Infractions discovered that 53 athletes in 14 sports from 1999 to 2001 were ineligible to compete due to improper paperwork and lack of academic credit hours. "There was no evidence that the violations were intentional. Rather, they were the result of a compliance coordinator being overwhelmed with Division I requirements with which he was unfamiliar," read the report.

Following the retirement of Nick Macarchuk, Connecticut assistant coach Steve Pikiell was named the new head coach prior to the 2005 season. While the Seawolves finished last place, going 4–24 (2–14 America East) in Pikiell's first season, he agreed to an extension through 2011 soon after the season ended. Stony Brook finished last again in the 2006–07 season after a 9–20 (4–12 record), and would do so again in the 2007–08 season with a 7–23 (3–13) record. During Stony Brook's first seven years in the America East, the Seawolves were 55–140 overall, 32–84 in the America East.

Pikiell brings success (2008–2016) 
Pikiell led the Seawolves to their lone NCAA Tournament appearance. In every season from 2009 to 2016, Stony Brook either won the America East regular season title or appeared in the America East Finals, but the immense regular season success came with only one America East tournament victory as the Seawolves lost four America East title games in five years.

2008–09 season 
In the 2008–09 season, Pikiell led Stony Brook to their first winning season since joining the America East. The Seawolves finished 16–14 (8–8) and earned a No. 4 seed in the America East championship tournament. However, they suffered an opening-round loss to New Hampshire.

2009–10 season 

Stony Brook's run of success in the America East began in the 2009–10 season. The Seawolves ended with a 22–10 (13–3) record and won their first America East regular season title in program history. With the No. 1 seed in the America East tournament, the Seawolves beat eighth-seeded Albany 68–59 in the quarterfinals but lost to Boston University 70–63 in the semifinals. Their regular season title earned them an automatic bid to the 2010 NIT, where they hosted and lost to Illinois in the first round. The successful season led to the school's largest broadcasting package, with three games scheduled on the main ESPN channel, two on ESPNU, one on SNY and five on MSG+.

Senior guard Muhammad El-Amin won America East Player of the Year, the first Stony Brook player to capture the award. El-Amin was the leading scorer on the Seawolves. Steve Pikiell won Coach of the Year, the first Stony Brook coach to earn the honor.

2010–11 season 

The 2010–2011 season started with a season opener game against the Connecticut Huskies at the Gampel Pavilion, resulting in a 79–52 loss to the eventual national champions and Pikiell's former team. Stony Brook won their ESPN debut against Monmouth, 51–49. The Seawolves entered conference play with a 6–8 record. The team ended the season with a 13–16 record, including an 8–8 record in America East play. The team earned a No. 5 seed in the America East tournament, defeating fourth-seeded Albany in the quarterfinals 67–61. The Seawolves pulled off a stunning upset against No. 1 seed Vermont in the semifinals, winning 69–47 to advance to the America East Finals for the first time in the program's history.

Hosted at Agganis Arena in Boston, Massachusetts, the Seawolves travelled to face a Boston Terriers team that had defeated them in the playoffs last year. Despite leading by as much as 15 in the second half, the team allowed 14 straight points to John Holland that cut their 41–26 lead to 41–40. With the score tied at 54 with 2.4 seconds left, Holland was fouled and made both free throws as Stony Brook lost 56–54 and their first NCAA Tournament bid came up short.

2011–12 season

Prior to the season, the Seawolves played an exhibition tour in Europe against five teams. Stony Brook had their most successful season yet in America East play, earning their second America East regular season championship and winning 14 games against the conference for the first time. They were one of thirteen Division I teams to go undefeated at home. As the No. 1 seed in the America East tournament, the Seawolves defeated Binghamton 78–69 in the first round. Stony Brook advanced to their second straight America East Finals after a buzzer-beater tip-in by Dallis Joyner gave the Seawolves a 57–55 victory against Albany in the semifinals.

In front of a sold-out crowd at the Stony Brook Arena, Stony Brook faced off against Vermont as they hosted their first conference Finals. However, the Seawolves lost 51–43 to the Catamounts, losing in the Finals and remaining just one game away from an NCAA Tournament bid for the second straight year. Their regular season title meant that Stony Brook earned an automatic bid to the 2012 NIT, losing to top-seeded Seton Hall in a close 63–61 game. Stony Brook ended the season with a 22–10 record, 14–2 in the America East.

Tommy Brenton won America East Defensive Player of the Year, the first ever Stony Brook player to do so, while Steve Pikiell won Coach of the Year for the second time.

2012–13 season 
Stony Brook began the season with a 9–4 record in non-conference play, only losing to Sacred Heart, UConn, Maryland, and Seton Hall. Once again, the Seawolves were dominant in America East play, capturing their third America East regular season title and their second straight. They ended the season winning six straight, and won 14 games in consecutive years. The Seawolves were the No. 1 seed in the America East tournament and upended Binghamton 72–49 in the quarterfinals. However, Stony Brook was upset by fourth-seeded Albany in the semifinals, denying their NCAA Tournament bid yet again. Despite trailing by 10 points with 3:47 left, the Seawolves came back to tie the game only to lose it on an Albany layup with 2.4 seconds left for a final score of 61–59. Stony Brook earned automatic bid into the 2013 NIT, where they beat UMass 71–58 in the first round for their first ever NIT victory. In the second round, they lost to Iowa 75–63. They ended the season 25–8, 14–2 in the America East.

Senior forward Tommy Brenton won America East Player of the Year and Defensive Player of the Year, freshman forward Jameel Warney won Rookie of the Year, and Pikiell won his third Coach of the Year award.

2013–14 season 
The season began with three straight victories, and the Seawolves began 8–4 in non-conference play before losing two straight to VCU and Columbia. They then won the first seven games in conference play, but ended the season with a 13–3 conference record to finish in second place behind Vermont. It was the first time since the 2010–11 season that Stony Brook did not win the America East regular season. As the No. 2 seed in the America East tournament, they beat Maine 80–54 in the quarterfinals and Hartford 69–64 in the semifinals to reach the America East Finals for the third time in four years.

However, for the fifth straight year, Stony Brook's NCAA Tournament ambitions were thwarted. Playing against Albany in front of a sold-out crowd at Pritchard Gymnasium, the Seawolves led 52–46 with 7:02 remaining, but the Great Danes roared back and defeated Stony Brook 69–60. Stony Brook received an invite to the 2014 College Basketball Invitational, where they lost to Siena 66–55 in the first round. Stony Brook finished the season with a 23–9 (13–3) record. As a sophomore, Warney won his first America East Player of the Year after ranking top five nationally in field goal percentage and leading Stony Brook in scoring, rebounding, and blocking.

2014–15 season 
The season was the first in which Stony Brook played their home games at the Island Federal Credit Union Arena. In the arena's debut game, Rayshaun McGrew hit a game-winning layup to beat Columbia 57–56. On December 28, the Seawolves upset No. 13 Washington on the road by a score of 62–57, their second win against a Power 5 conference in program history after beating Penn State in 2006. It was the program's first ever win against a ranked opponent. The team ended the season on a six-game winning streak and finished in second place in the America East regular season with a 12–4 record. In the America East tournament, Stony Brook beat Binghamton 62–57 and Vermont 79–77 to reach their fourth America East Finals game in five years, still searching for their first NCAA Tournament berth.

For the second straight year, Stony Brook faced Albany in the America East Finals, but this game was played upstate. Stony Brook led for almost the entire game but collapsed in the waning moments. Albany's Peter Hooley hit a three-pointer with 1.6 seconds to give the Great Danes a 51–50 victory after trailing for the rest of the contest as Albany benefited off of several Stony Brook turnovers and missed free throws. In the 2015 College Basketball Invitational, Stony Brook lost to Mercer 72–70 in the first round. Warney won his second straight America East Player of the Year award, as well as Defensive Player of the Year, after leading the nation with 20 double-doubles and ranking fifth with 11.4 rebounds per game.

2015–16 season: First NCAA Tournament berth

Stony Brook finished non-conference play with a 9–4 record, winning their final five games. The Seawolves began to garner national attention as they won the first thirteen games of conference play and their winning streak grew to 18 games, at the time the longest active streak in Division I. The streak was snapped on February 17 in an 82–70 loss to Albany that knocked Stony Brook to 22–5. The Seawolves lost the final game of the regular season, their first home loss of the year, to Vermont by a score of 76–62. However, Stony Brook still earned their fourth America East regular season championship in program history.

Stony Brook beat UMBC 86–76 in the quarterfinals and Hartford 80–64 in the semifinals, making their third straight America East Finals and their fifth in six years. Taking on Vermont, it looked as if the Seawolves would miss out yet again as they trailed by 14 points in the second half, but a furious comeback led by Finals MVP Jameel Warney, who scored 43 points, allowed Stony Brook to pull off the 80–74 comeback victory as they earned their first-ever berth to the NCAA Tournament.

As the No. 13 seed, Stony Brook faced No. 4–seeded Kentucky in the first round, but convincingly lost 85–57.

Warney won his third consecutive America East Player of the Year award, averaging a double-double for the second straight season. Warney joined Vermont's Taylor Coppenrath and Northeastern's Reggie Lewis as the only players to win three America East Player of the Year awards. Warney also won Defensive Player of the Year for the second straight year. Pikiell was named Coach of the Year for the fourth time.

Jeff Boals takes over (2016–2019)
On March 20, 2016, three days after the Seawolves' loss to Kentucky in the NCAA Tournament, it was announced that head coach Steve Pikiell would leave the school to accept the job as the new head coach for Rutgers. He finished at Stony Brook with an eleven-year record of 192–157. On April 8, the school announced they had hired Jeff Boals as new head coach. Boals joined Stony Brook after seven years as an assistant coach for the Ohio State Buckeyes men's basketball team under the tutelage of Thad Matta.

With the top three scorers from the previous year graduating and the new coaching regime, the Seawolves were picked to finish seventh out of nine teams in the America East Conference in the 2016–17 preseason polls. The Seawolves concluded their season finishing in surprising 2nd place with a 17–12 record (12–4 America East). After beating Binghamton 70–60 in the quarterfinals of the America East tournament, Stony Brook was upset at home by third-seeded Albany, 63–56.

The 2017–18 season saw a disappointing fifth-place finish in the America East after going 7–9 in conference play. The Seawolves upset the Pikiell-led Rutgers in a 75–73 overtime victory on December 22. The team beat Albany 69–60 in the America East tournament quarterfinals but eventually lost to top-seeded Vermont 70–51 in the semifinals. Freshman forward Elijah Olaniyi was named America East Rookie of the Year.

Stony Brook began the 2018–19 season with a historic comeback at George Washington, winning 77–74 in overtime after trailing 22–0 to start the game. Three days later, they beat South Carolina 83–81 for their first ever victory against an SEC team. The Seawolves ended non-conference play with a 12–3 record; the twelve wins were a school record as a Division I program, and they led the nation with seven true road wins. The Seawolves earned the No. 2 seed in the America East Playoffs after going 12–4 in conference, including leading the nation with thirteen road wins. They were upset by seventh-seeded Binghamton 78–72 in the quarterfinals, Stony Brook's first quarterfinal loss in a decade. Sophomore center Jeff Otchere was named America East Defensive Player of the Year, and sophomore guard/forward Andrew Garcia won America East Sixth Man of the Year.

On March 17, 2019, Boals resigned from his position to accept the head coaching job for the Ohio Bobcats. In three seasons with the Seawolves, Boals led the team to a 55–41 record, including a 33–17 record in America East play. Assistant coach Geno Ford was named Stony Brook's interim head coach during the 2019 College Basketball Invitational, where the Seawolves blew a 25-point first-half lead against South Florida, ultimately losing 82–79 in overtime.

The Geno Ford era (2019–present) 
On March 26, 2019, Ford's interim tag was removed and he was officially named the fourth head coach in the program's Division I era. In Ford's first season, Stony Brook won 20 games for the eighth time in the last 11 seasons and finished in second place in the America East, their ninth top-2 finish over that time period. After defeating Albany in the America East quarterfinals, Stony Brook was upset 64–58 at home by Hartford in the semifinals to end their season at 20–13. In the offseason, the program lost three stars to Power 5 schools, with Elijah Olaniyi transferring to Miami (FL), Makale Foreman transferring to California and Andrew Garcia transferring to Georgia.

In Ford's second season, Stony Brook finished 9–14, their worst record in 13 years. The Seawolves were eliminated in the first round of the America East playoffs after blowing a 16-point second half lead against UMass Lowell. Mouhamadou Gueye was named the America East Defensive Player of the Year.

Facilities 

The Seawolves play their home games in the Island Federal Credit Union Arena. The facility underwent a $21.1 million renovation from 2012–2014, and has a capacity of 4,160 seats. This includes four luxury boxes and a VIP lounge area at the lodge level with premium courtside seating. It contains four scoreboards and two video boards.

From 2008 to 2013, the Seawolves played at Pritchard Gymnasium as the Stony Brook Arena underwent renovations.

Team

Retired numbers 

On February 18, 2017, less than a year after his graduation, power forward Jameel Warney's No. 20 was retired in a ceremony. It was the first number to be retired for a Stony Brook basketball player. Warney, a three-time America East Player of the Year, is Stony Brook's all-time leader in career points, rebounds, blocks, and games played. When Warney signed a 10-day contract with the Dallas Mavericks on March 11, 2018, he became the first Stony Brook alum to play in the NBA.

Coaches

Head coaches

The following have been the head coaches of Stony Brook men's basketball since 1960.

Dan Farrel (1960–64)
Herb Brown (1964–69)
Rollie Massimino (1969–71)
Don Covaleski (1971–74)
Ron Bash (1974–78)
Dick Kendall (1978–84)
Joe Castigle (1984–91)
Bernard Tomlin (1991–99)
Nick Macarchuk (1999–05)
Steve Pikiell (2005–16)
Jeff Boals (2016–19)
Geno Ford (2019–present)

Current coaching staff

Postseason

NCAA tournament results
The Seawolves made their first trip ever to the NCAA tournament in 2016 after winning the conference regular season and tournament championships. They lost in the first round as a #13 seed.

NIT results
The Seawolves achieved their first National Invitation Tournament (NIT) appearance in 2010. They achieved their first ever postseason tournament victory by defeating Massachusetts in the first round of the 2013 NIT before losing to Iowa in the second round. Their overall combined NIT record is 1–3.

CBI results
The Seawolves have appeared in the College Basketball Invitational (CBI) four times. Their combined record is 0–4.

Season-by-season results

Rivalries
 Albany

Albany is Stony Brook's in-state rival and biggest rival in general in athletics. This has led to intense competition in basketball games each year. Fans and players of both schools show a lot of passion in these rivalry games. Besides regular season schedule, these teams regularly met in America East tournaments and played fierce and competitive games.

 Vermont
A heated rivalry between Vermont and Stony Brook was inevitable. Latter years of Pikiell, especially between 2009 and 2016, Stony Brook fielded competitive teams and regularly challenged for America East title. Catamounts were one of the top teams in the conference during those years and Stony Brook often found them to be the most difficult opponent.

 Hofstra

Known as the Battle of Long Island, Stony Brook in Suffolk County and Hofstra in Nassau County represent the only two Division I basketball programs on Long Island. The rivalry was temporarily suspended beginning during the 2008–09 season due to Hofstra's decision, but it was resumed in 2014. Hofstra leads the all-time series 20–4.

Awards 
America East Coach of the Year

 Steve Pikiell – 2010, 2012, 2013, 2016

America East Player of the Year

 Muhammed El-Amin – 2010
 Tommy Brenton – 2013
 Jameel Warney – 2014, 2015, 2016

America East Defensive Player of the Year

 Tommy Brenton – 2012, 2013
 Jameel Warney – 2015, 2016
 Jeff Otchere – 2019
Mouhamadou Gueye – 2021

America East Rookie of the Year

 Jameel Warney – 2013
 Elijah Olaniyi – 2018

America East Sixth Man of the Year

 Andrew Garcia – 2019

America East All-Conference First Team

 Muhammed El-Amin – 2010
 Bryan Dougher – 2011
 Tommy Brenton – 2011, 2012
 Jameel Warney – 2014, 2015, 2016
 Carson Puriefoy – 2015, 2016
 Lucas Woodhouse – 2017
 Akwasi Yeboah – 2019
Elijah Olaniyi – 2020

America East All-Conference Defensive Team

 Marques Cox – 2009
 Tommy Brenton – 2010, 2012, 2013
 Jameel Warney – 2013, 2015, 2016
 Dave Coley – 2013, 2014
 Rayshaun McGrew – 2016
 Ahmad Walker – 2016
 Roland Nyama – 2017
 Jeff Otchere – 2019, 2020
Mouhamadou Gueye – 2021

See also 

 Stony Brook Seawolves women's basketball

References